This is a list of foreign football players in Ukrainian Vyscha Liha/Premier-Liha by clubs (35 teams). The players written with bold text have at least one cap for their national team.

There is a total of 695 foreign players in Vyscha Liha/Premier-Liha of 60 different nationalities of which 370 have been capped at least once for their national team. Also there is a total of 27 foreign players of 21 different nationalities who don't played in Vyscha Liha/Premier-Liha.

Listed by club

FC Arsenal Kyiv 44+0
 Arman Karamyan – Armenia
 Artavazd Karamyan – Armenia
 Albert Sarkisyan – Armenia
 Syarhey Amelyanchuk – Belarus
 Andrey Astrowski – Belarus
 Alyaksandr Danilaw – Belarus
 Syarhey Kuznyatsow – Belarus
 Alan – Brazil
 Gil Bala – Brazil
 Paul Essola  – Cameroon
 Patrick Ibanda  – Cameroon
 Goran Brajković  – Croatia
 Dario Brgles  – Croatia
 Ivica Pirić  – Croatia
 Shalva Apkhazava – Georgia
 Giorgi Demetradze – Georgia
 Lasha Jakobia – Georgia
 Jaba Kankava – Georgia
 Levan Mikadze – Georgia
 Gela Shekiladze – Georgia
 László Bodnár – Hungary
 Andrius Jokšas – Lithuania
 Saulius Mikoliūnas – Lithuania
 Sendley Sidney Bito  – Netherlands Antilles
 Emmanuel Okoduwa – Nigeria
 Harrison Omoko – Nigeria
 Seweryn Gancarczyk – Poland
 Maciej Kowalczyk – Poland
 Ionuț Mazilu – Romania
 Florin Costin Șoavă – Romania
 Maksim Aristarkhov – Russia
 Aleksandr Danishevsky – Russia
 Andrey Eshchenko – Russia
 Rolan Gusev  – Russia
 Sergei Kryuchikhin – Russia
 German Kutarba – Russia
 Aleksandr Orekhov – Russia
 Aleksandr Sonin – Russia
 Aleksei Uvarov – Russia
 Mirko Bunjevčević – Serbia
 Ivan Perić – Serbia
 Vladimir Ribić – Serbia
 Guwançmuhammet Öwekow – Turkmenistan
 Maksim Shatskikh – Uzbekistan
---
 František Hanc – Slovakia

FC Borysfen Boryspil 1
 Oleg Khromtsov – Moldova

FC Bukovyna Chernivtsi 3
 Vladimir Gaidamaşchuc – Moldova
 Lev Berezner – Russia
 Andrei Zhirov – Russia

FC Chornomorets Odessa 53+2
 Damián Giménez – Argentina
 Pablo Vitti – Argentina
 Armen Shahgeldyan – Armenia
 Branimir Subašić – Azerbaijan
 Andrey Astrowski – Belarus
 Uladzimir Haew – Belarus
 Uladzimir Karytska – Belarus
 Pavel Kirylchyk – Belarus
 Yawhen Lashankow – Belarus
 Gustavo Pinedo – Bolivia
 Mauricio Saucedo – Bolivia
 Đorđe Inđić – Bosnia and Herzegovina
 Léo Matos – Brazil
 Narciso Mina – Ecuador
 Ilia Kandelaki – Georgia
 Irakli Modebadze – Georgia
 Kakhaber Mzhavanadze – Georgia
 Giorgi Shashiashvili – Georgia
 Zsolt Nagy – Hungary
 Sergey Kostyuk – Kazakhstan
 Vladimirs Koļesņičenko – Latvia
 Igor Bugaiov – Moldova
 Valeriu Catinsus – Moldova
 Iurie Miterev – Moldova
 Igor Oprea – Moldova
 Mirko Raičević – Montenegro
 José Carlos Fernández – Peru
 Paolo de la Haza – Peru
 Edgar Villamarín – Peru
 Vyacheslav Bakharev – Russia
 Andrei Gashkin – Russia
 Aleksandr Gorshkov – Russia
 Aleksei Igonin – Russia
 Konstantin Kamnev – Russia
 Vladimir Lebed – Russia
 Sergei Lysenko – Russia
 Marat Makhmutov – Russia
 Valentin Nefyodov – Russia
 Yuri Nikiforov – FC Chornomorets Odessa – Russia
 Gennadiy Nizhegorodov – Russia
 Sergei Osipov – Russia
 Aleksandr Ponomaryov – Russia
 Sergei Prikhodko – Russia
 Sergei Sukhoruchenkov – Russia
 Vladislav Ternavsky – Russia
 Aleksei Uvarov – Russia
 Siniša Branković – Serbia
 Mirko Bunjevčević – Serbia
 Marko Jovanović – Serbia
 Aleksandar Trišović – Serbia
 Vitaliy Parakhnevych – Tajikistan
 Alejandro Mello – Uruguay
 Sebastián Vázquez – Uruguay
 Aleksandr Khvostunov – Uzbekistan
---
 Giorgi Czelebadze – Georgia
 Shuhrat Mamajonov – Tajikistan

FC CSKA Kyiv 8
 Mihail Makowski – Belarus
 Uladzimir Makowski – Belarus
 Mafoumba Mfilu – Democratic Republic of the Congo
 Vitaly Daraselia – Georgia
 Levan Mikadze – Georgia
 Andrius Jokšas – Lithuania
 Andrei Karyaka – Russia
 Vitaliy Levchenko – Tajikistan

FC Dnipro Dnipropetrovsk 39+3
 Osmar Ferreyra – Argentina
 Syarhey Karnilenka – Belarus
 Émerson – Brazil
 Alcides – Brazil
 Davidson – Brazil
 Georgi Peev – Bulgaria
 Paul Essola  – Cameroon
 Igor Lolo – Cote d'Ivoire
 Mladen Bartulović – Croatia
 Denis Glavina – Croatia
 Mario Holek – Czech Republic
 Jan Laštůvka – Czech Republic
 Kakhaber Aladashvili – Georgia
 Revazi Barabadze – Georgia
 Beka Gotsiridze – Georgia
 Jaba Kankava – Georgia
 Giorgi Kilasonia – Georgia
 Varlam Kilasonia – Georgia
 Aleqsandr Kobakhidze – Georgia
 Ucha Lobjanidze – Georgia
 Mikhail Potskhveria – Georgia
 Andreas Sassen – Germany
 Oleg Chukhleba – Kazakhstan
 Konstantin Ledovskikh – Kazakhstan
 Konstantin Pavlyuchenko – Kazakhstan
 Linas Klimavičius – Lithuania
 Nery Castillo – Mexico
 Alexandru Popovici – Moldova
 Gheorghe Stratulat – Moldova
 Alexandru Suharev – Moldova
 Dan Găldeanu Romania
 Ionuț Mazilu – Romania
 Sergei Bespalykh – Russia
 Andrey Eshchenko – Russia
 Rolan Gusev  – Russia
 Vladimir Lebed – Russia
 Sergei Mamchur – Russia
 Sergey Samodin – Russia
 Vitaliy Denisov – Uzbekistan
---
 Dzmitry Lyantsevich – Belarus
 Levan Arveladze – Georgia
 Vadim Egoshkin – Kazakhstan

FC Dynamo Kyiv 66+12
 Roberto Nanni – Argentina
 Yervand Sukiasyan – Armenia
 Valyantsin Byalkevich – Belarus
 Syarhey Karnilenka – Belarus
 Alyaksandr Khatskevich – Belarus
 Mihail Makowski – Belarus
 Uladzimir Makowski – Belarus
 Gérson Magrão – Brazil
 Leandro Almeida – Brazil
 Betão – Brazil
 Rodrigo – Brazil
 Danilo Silva – Brazil
 Rodolfo – Brazil
 Kléber – Brazil
 Leandro Machado – Brazil
 Guilherme – Brazil
 Alessandro – Brazil
 Diogo Rincón – Brazil
 Michael – Brazil
 Corrêa – Brazil
 Georgi Peev – Bulgaria
 Jerko Leko – Croatia
 Goran Sablić – Croatia
 Ognjen Vukojević – Croatia
 Roman Eremenko – Finland
 Kakhaber Aladashvili – Georgia
 Malkhaz Asatiani – Georgia
 Giorgi Demetradze – Georgia
 Davit Imedashvili – Georgia
 Mikheil Jishkariani – Georgia
 Kakha Kaladze – Georgia
 Otar Martsvaladze – Georgia
 Ismaël Bangoura – Guinea
 László Bodnár – Hungary
 Balázs Farkas – Hungary
 Naser Al-Sauhi – Kuwait
 Māris Verpakovskis – Latvia
 Edgaras Česnauskis – Lithuania
 Gintaras Kvitkauskas – Lithuania
 Valdemaras Martinkėnas – Lithuania
 Igoris Pankratjevas – Lithuania
 Badr El Kaddouri – Morocco
 Lucky Idahor – Nigeria
 Frank Temile – Nigeria
 Ayila Yussuf – Nigeria
 Florin Cernat – Romania
 Tiberiu Ghioane – Romania
 Cristian Irimia – Romania
 Andrey Aleksanenkov – Russia
 Maksim Demenko – Russia
 Andrey Eshchenko – Russia
 Aleksandr Filimonov – Russia
 Aleksei Gerasimenko – Russia
 Vladimir Kuzmichyov – Russia
 Ramiz Mamedov – Russia
 Oleg Salenko – Russia
 Akhrik Tsveiba – Russia
 Valery Yesipov – Russia
 Pape Diakhaté – Senegal
 Demba Touré – Senegal
 Goran Gavrančić – Serbia
 Marjan Marković – Serbia
 Miloš Ninković – Serbia
 Perica Ognjenović – Serbia
 Andriy Khomyn – Turkmenistan
 Maksim Shatskikh – Uzbekistan
---
 Facundo Bertoglio  – Argentina
 Diego Orlando Suárez – Bolivia
 Atanas Chipilov – Bulgaria
 Harrison Otálvaro Arce – Colombia
 José Moreno Mora – Colombia
 Tomislav Bušić – Croatia
 Chakhir Belghazouani – France
 Marc Fachan – France
 Irakli Kortua – Georgia
 Lasha Totadze – Georgia
 Adrian Sosnovschi – Moldova
 Emmanuel Okoduwa – Nigeria
 Zoran Kulić – Serbia

FC Illychivets Mariupol 20
 Ara Hakobyan – Armenia
 Aram Hakobyan – Armenia
 Pavel Byahanski – Belarus
 Tsimafey Kalachow – Belarus
 Mikalay Kashewski – Belarus
 Pavel Kirylchyk – Belarus
 Rogério Corrêa – Brazil
 Lima – Brazil – Brazil
 Kamdem – Cameroon
 Giorgi Gabedava – Georgia
 Sergi Orbeladze – Georgia
 Georgi Tsimakuridze – Georgia
 Dainius Gleveckas – Lithuania
 Vytautas Lukša – Lithuania
 Gediminas Paulauskas – Lithuania
 Mantas Samusiovas – Lithuania
 Serghei Lașcencov – Moldova
 Darko Bojović – Montenegro
 Aleksandr Malygin – Russia
 Valentin Nefyodov – Russia

FC Karpaty Lviv 32+2
 Elhan Rasulov – Azerbaijan
 Pavel Kirylchyk – Belarus
 Leanid Kovel – Belarus
 Alyaksey Suchkow – Belarus
 Alyaksandr Yurevich – Belarus
 Edin Kunić – Bosnia and Herzegovina
 William Batista – Brazil
 Igor Jovičević – Croatia
 Jerko Mikulić – Croatia
 Sergei Zenjov – Estonia
 Alexander Guruli – Georgia
 Giorgi Lomaia – Georgia
 Mohamed Alkhaly Soumah – Guinea
 Raimonds Laizāns – Latvia
 Vlade Lazarevski – Macedonia
 Serghei Covalciuc – Moldova
 Alexandru Golban – Moldova
 Serghei Lașcencov – Moldova
 Mladen Kašćelan – Montenegro
 Edward Anyamke – Nigeria
 Samson Godwin – Nigeria
 Lucky Idahor – Nigeria
 Maciej Nalepa – Poland
 Augustin Chiriță – Romania
 Ivica Janićijević – Serbia
 Ivan Milošević – Serbia
 Dušan Šimić – Serbia
 Nemanja Tubić – Serbia
 František Hanc – Slovakia
 Peter Sukovský – Slovakia
 Senad Tiganj – Slovenia
 Henry Mutambikwa – Zimbabwe
---
 Radosław Cierzniak – Poland
 Oleg Sobirov – Uzbekistan

FC Kharkiv 12+2
 Yawhen Lashankow – Belarus
 Alyaksey Pankavets – Belarus
 Alyaksey Suchkow – Belarus
 William Batista – Brazil
 Anderson Ribeiro – Brazil
 Kakhaber Aladashvili – Georgia
 Victor Barîșev – Moldova
 Igor Țîgîrlaș – Moldova
 Maciej Nalepa – Poland
 Abbe Ibrahim – Togo
 Ameur Derbal – Tunisia
 Guwançmuhammet Öwekow – Turkmenistan
---
 Syarhey Veramko – Belarus
 Andrei Khodykin – Russia

FC Kremin Kremenchuk 10
 Konstantin Kovalenko – Belarus
 Anzor Kavteladze – Georgia
 Anton Shokh – Kazakhstan
 Oleg Kazmirchuk – Kyrgyzstan
 Sergei Barkalov – Russia
 Andrei Fedkov – Russia
 Yuri Sobol – Russia
 Sergei Troitskiy – Russia
 Muslim Agaýew – Turkmenistan
 Yuri Magdiýew – Turkmenistan

FC Kryvbas Kryvyi Rih 65
 Ansi Agolli – Albania
 Ervin Bulku – Albania
 Dorian Bylykbashi – Albania
 Isli Hidi – Albania
 Henri Ndreka – Albania
 Bledi Shkëmbi – Albania
 Vladislav Nosenko – Azerbaijan
 Mikalay Kashewski – Belarus
 Pavel Kirylchyk – Belarus
 Artur Lesko – Belarus
 Artur Matsveychyk – Belarus
 Ihar Razhkow – Belarus
 Alyaksandr Shahoyka – Belarus
 Andrey Varankaw – Belarus
 Weslei Ribeiro – Brazil
 Patrick Ibanda – Cameroon
 Mladen Bartulović – Croatia
 Ronald Šiklić – Croatia
 Vladimir Burduli – Georgia
 Iuri Gabiskiria – Georgia
 Vasil Gigiadze – Georgia
 Revaz Gotsiridze – Georgia
 Aleksandr Kaidarashvili – Georgia
 Aleqsandr Kobakhidze – Georgia
 Levan Mikadze – Georgia
 Zurab Popkhadze – Georgia
 Konstantin Pavlyuchenko – Kazakhstan
 Fanas Salimov – Kazakhstan
 Igors Korabļovs – Latvia
 Artūrs Silagailis – Latvia
 Kęstutis Ivaškevičius – Lithuania
 Andrius Jokšas – Lithuania
 Serghei Epureanu – Moldova
 Denis Ilescu – Moldova
 Alexandru Popovici – Moldova
 Andrei Stroenco – Moldova
 Tony Alegbe – Nigeria
 Chukwudi Nworgu – Nigeria
 Piotr Cetnarowicz – Poland
 Dan Găldeanu Romania
 Magomed Adiev – Russia
 Aleksandr Gorin – Russia
 Stanislav Kriulin – Russia
 Vladislav Mayorov – Russia
 Andrei Panfyorov – Russia
 Sergei Pravkin – Russia
 Murad Ramazanov – Russia
 Oleg Simakov – Russia
 Sergei Sukhoruchenkov – Russia
 Branko Ašković – Serbia
 Ilija Borenović – Serbia
 Goran Ćosić – Serbia
 Darko Dunjić – Serbia
 Igor Đinović – Serbia
 Slavoljub Đorđević – Serbia
 Željko Ljubenović – Serbia
 Sead Salahović – Serbia
 Vučina Šćepanović – Serbia
 Rade Todorović – Serbia
 Aleksandar Trišović – Serbia
 Milan Zagorac – Serbia
 Oleg Belyakov – Uzbekistan
 Jafar Irismetov – Uzbekistan
 Anvar Jabborov – Uzbekistan

FC Lviv 0
Only players who holds Ukrainian citizenship.

FC Metalist Kharkiv 48
 Walter Acevedo – Argentina
 Hernán Fredes – Argentina
 Jonathan Maidana – Argentina
 Samvel Arakelyan – Armenia
 Alyaksandr Danilaw – Belarus
 Vasil Khamutowski – Belarus
 Syarhey Kuznyatsow – Belarus
 Marcos Paulo – Brazil
 Jajá – Brazil
 André Conceição – Brazil
 Jader – Brazil
 Edmar – Brazil
 Marcelo – Brazil
 Fininho – Brazil
 Anderson Ribeiro – Brazil
 Alain Amougou – Cameroon
 Abdoulaye Djire – Cote d'Ivoire
 Venance Zézé – Cote d'Ivoire
 Alexei Eremenko – Finland
 Lasha Jakobia – Georgia
 Sergey Kostyuk – Kazakhstan
 Vidas Alunderis – Lithuania
 Vlade Lazarevski – Macedonia
 Valeriu Andronic – Moldova
 Vitaliy Bordiyan – Moldova
 Gheorghe Harea – Moldova
 Serghei Lașcencov – Moldova
 Igor Țîgîrlaș – Moldova
 Hicham Mahdoufi – Morocco
 Onyekachi Paul Nwoha – Nigeria
 Marcin Burkhardt – Poland
 Seweryn Gancarczyk – Poland
 Iulian Dăniță – Romania
 Flavius Stoican – Romania
 Guram Adzhoyev – Russia
 Erik Ashurbekov – Russia
 Karen Oganyan – Russia
 Valeri Panchik – Russia
 Yuri Petrov – Russia
 Sergei Ryzhikh – Russia
 Yevgeni Varlamov – Russia
 Papa Gueye – Senegal
 Marko Dević – Serbia
 Miljan Mrdaković – Serbia
 Milan Obradović – Serbia
 Aleksandar Trišović – Serbia
 Marián Adam – Slovakia
 Dmitri Khomukha – Turkmenistan

FC Metalurh Donetsk 76+1
 Elvin Beqiri – Albania
 Rubén Gómez – Argentina
 Ararat Arakelyan – Armenia
 Artak Dashyan – Armenia
 Ara Hakobyan – Armenia
 Yegishe Melikyan – Armenia
 Samvel Melkonyan – Armenia
 Henrikh Mkhitaryan – Armenia
 Alyaksandr Danilaw – Belarus
 Uladzimir Karytska – Belarus
 William Boaventura – Brazil
 Zé Soares – Brazil
 Alan – Brazil
 Fabinho – Brazil
 Leandro – Brazil
 Aílton – Brazil
 Márcio Glad – Brazil
 Júlio César – Brazil
 Sergio Oliveira – Brazil
 Paulo Vogt – Brazil
 Velizar Dimitrov – Bulgaria
 Chavdar Yankov – Bulgaria
 Aristide Bancé – Burkina Faso
 Bernard Tchoutang – Cameroon
 Abdoulaye Djire – Cote d'Ivoire
 Igor Lolo – Cote d'Ivoire
 Arsène Né – Cote d'Ivoire
 Yaya Touré – Cote d'Ivoire
 Venance Zézé – Cote d'Ivoire
 Ivica Žuljević – Croatia
 Constantinos Makrides – Cyprus
 Nzelo Hervé Lembi – Democratic Republic of the Congo
 Giorgi Demetradze – Georgia
 Giorgi Gakhokidze – Georgia
 Gocha Jamarauli – Georgia
 Levan Tskitishvili – Georgia
 Vitaliy Abramov – Kazakhstan
 Oleg Kapustnikov – Kazakhstan
 Sergey Zhunenko – Kazakhstan
 Andrius Gedgaudas – Lithuania
 Marius Skinderis – Lithuania
 Igor Gjuzelov – Macedonia
 Boban Grnčarov – Macedonia
 Jordi Cruyff – Netherlands
 Patrick Agbo Umomo – Nigeria
 Tony Alegbe – Nigeria
 Haruna Babangida – Nigeria
 Joseph Eyimofe – Nigeria
 Pius Ikedia – Nigeria
 Sunny Ekeh Kingsley – Nigeria
 Ochuko Ojobo – Nigeria
 Emmanuel Okoduwa – Nigeria
 Samuel Okunowo – Nigeria
 Andrés Mendoza – Peru
 China – Portugal
 Ricardo Fernandes – Portugal
 Mário Sérgio – Portugal
 Marian Aliuță – Romania
 Iulian Arhire – Romania
 Daniel Florea – Romania
 Marius Mitu – Romania
 Marian Savu – Romania
 Ciprian Tănasă – Romania
 Vladimir Dišljenković – Serbia
 Marko Grubelić – Serbia
 Ivan Gvozdenović – Serbia
 Đorđe Lazić – Serbia
 Slobodan Marković – Serbia
 Nenad Mladenović – Serbia
 Bojan Neziri – Serbia
 Bratislav Ristić – Serbia
 Ilija Stolica – Serbia
 Dani Fernández – Spain
 Anis Boussaidi – Tunisia
 Erol Bulut – Turkey
 Musawengosi Mguni – Zimbabwe
---
 Ibrahim Touré – Côte d'Ivoire

FC Metalurh Zaporizhzhia 63
 Tefik Osmani – Albania
 Bledi Shkëmbi – Albania
 Vardan Khachatryan – Armenia
 Artsyom Chelyadzinski – Belarus
 Barys Haravoy – Belarus
 Uladzimir Karytska – Belarus
 Mikalay Kashewski – Belarus
 Syarhey Shtanyuk – Belarus
 Yan Tsiharow – Belarus
 Spomenko Bošnjak – Bosnia and Herzegovina
 Aleksandar Brdjanin – Bosnia and Herzegovina
 Nikola Vasiljević – Bosnia and Herzegovina
 Tomislav Višević – Bosnia and Herzegovina
 Toledo – Brazil
 Matheus – Brazil
 Washington Teixeira – Brazil
 Fabio – Brazil
 Valentin Iliev – Bulgaria
 Aleksandar Tomash Tomovski – Bulgaria
 Adolphe Teikeu – Cameroon
 Mario Dodić – Croatia
 Mirko Selak – Croatia
 Lasha Chelidze – Georgia
 Dato Kvirkvelia – Georgia
 Irakli Modebadze – Georgia
 Mikhail Potskhveria – Georgia
 Jevgenijs Gorjacilovs – Latvia
 Valentīns Lobaņovs – Latvia
 Armands Zeiberliņš – Latvia
 Andrius Brazauskas – Lithuania
 Mindaugas Kalonas – Lithuania
 Darius Miceika – Lithuania
 Hristijan Kirovski – Macedonia
 Dančo Masev – Macedonia
 Igor Mitreski – Macedonia
 Darko Tasevski – Macedonia
 Igor Bugaiov – Moldova
 Vasile Caraus – Moldova
 Marcel Reșitca – Moldova
 Alexei Savinov – Moldova
 Igor Țîgîrlaș – Moldova
 Eduard Valutsa – Moldova
 Aloisi – Nigeria
 Daniel Baston – Romania
 Daniel Florea – Romania
 Ionel Pârvu – Romania
 Maksim Aristarkhov – Russia
 Andriy Demchenko – Russia
 Andrei Karyaka – Russia
 German Kutarba – Russia
 Yevgeni Saprykin – Russia
 Valeri Shevyrev – Russia
 Ruslan Suanov – Russia
 Valeri Tkachuk – Russia
 Kirill Varaksin – Russia
 Miodrag Anđelković – Serbia
 Uroš Milosavljević – Serbia
 Dragan Perišić – Serbia
 Ljubiša Ranković – Serbia
 Aco Vasiljević – Serbia
 Ján Zolna – Slovakia
 Hwang Hun-hee – South Korea
 Kim Pyung-rae – South Korea

SC Mykolaiv 6
 Niazi Brunjadze – Georgia
 Mamuka Jugeli – Georgia
 Temur Margoshia – Georgia
 Fanas Salimov – Kazakhstan
 Anton Shokh – Kazakhstan
 Yuri Petrov – Russia

FC Naftovyk-Ukrnafta Okhtyrka 6
 Vasil Gigiadze – Georgia
 Aurimas Kučys – Lithuania
 Eduard Valutsa – Moldova
 Anatoli Kretov – Russia
 Valentin Nefyodov – Russia
 Branko Baković – Serbia

FC Nyva Ternopil 25
 Vasyl Kolev – Bulgaria
 Yulian Neichev – Bulgaria
 Stanimir Stalev – Bulgaria
 Shota Chomakhidze – Georgia
 Giorgi Davitnidze – Georgia
 Kakhaber Dgebuadze – Georgia
 Avtandil Gvianidze – Georgia
 Aleksandr Kaidarashvili – Georgia
 Avtandil Kapanadze – Georgia
 Tariel Kapanadze – Georgia
 Shalva Khujadze – Georgia
 Konstantin Metreveli – Georgia
 Irakli Shengelia – Georgia
 Avtandil Sikharulidze – Georgia
 Tengiz Ugrekhelidze – Georgia
 Konstantin Pavlyuchenko – Kazakhstan
 Fanas Salimov – Kazakhstan
 Oleg Kazmirchuk – Kyrgyzstan
 Igoris Pankratjevas – Lithuania
 Andrei Gashkin – Russia
 Sergei Polstyanov – Russia
 Vladislav Ternavsky – Russia
 Vitaliy Parakhnevych – Tajikistan
 Muslim Agaýew – Turkmenistan
 Yuri Magdiýew – Turkmenistan

FC Nyva Vinnytsia 8
 Aleksandr Zhidkov – Azerbaijan
 Daniil Richard – Kazakhstan
 Vladimir Gaidamaşchuc – Moldova
 Alexandru Guzun – Moldova
 Gheorghe Harea – Moldova
 Eduard Akbarov – Russia
 Aleksandr Gorshkov – Russia
 Valeri Petrinsky – Russia

FC Obolon Kyiv 5+1
 Andrey Varankaw – Belarus
 William Rocha Batista – Brazil
 Vitaliy Kobzar – Kyrgyzstan
 Victor Comleonoc – Moldova
 Andrei Solomatin – Russia
---
 Vladimir Bulatović – Serbia

SC Odessa 2
 Andrei Stroenco – Moldova
 Vitaliy Parakhnevych – Tajikistan

FC Polihraftekhnika Oleksandria 1
 Zsolt Nagy – Hungary

FC Prykarpattya Ivano-Frankivsk 5+1
 Mamuka Jugeli – Georgia
 Tagir Fasakhov – Kyrgyzstan
 Sergei Bespalykh – Russia
 Eduard Sarkisov – Russia
 Andriy Khomyn – Turkmenistan
---
 Fizuli Mammedov – Azerbaijan

FC Shakhtar Donetsk 58+1
 Tsimafey Kalachow – Belarus
 Syarhey Yaskovich – Belarus
 Marcelo Moreno – Bolivia
 Leonardo – Brazil
 João Batista – Brazil
 Elano – Brazil
 Willian – Brazil
 Douglas Costa – Brazil
 Brandão – Brazil
 Matuzalém – Brazil
 Ilsinho – Brazil
 Jádson – Brazil
 Fernandinho – Brazil
 Ivan – Brazil
 Luiz Adriano – Brazil
 Alex Teixeira – Brazil
 Predrag Pažin – Bulgaria
 Stipe Pletikosa – Croatia
 Darijo Srna – Croatia
 Tomáš Hübschman – Czech Republic
 Jan Laštůvka – Czech Republic
 Giorgi Chikhradze – Georgia
 Iuri Gabiskiria – Georgia
 Mikhail Potskhveria – Georgia
 Cristiano Lucarelli – Italy
 Vitaliy Abramov – Kazakhstan
 Sergey Zhunenko – Kazakhstan
 Andrejs Štolcers – Latvia
 Dainius Gleveckas – Lithuania
 Igor Gjuzelov – Macedonia
 Nery Castillo – Mexico
 Julius Aghahowa – Nigeria
 Emmanuel Okoduwa – Nigeria
 Isaac Okoronkwo – Nigeria
 Wojciech Kowalewski – Poland
 Mariusz Lewandowski – Poland
 Marian Aliuță – Romania
 Cosmin Bărcăuan – Romania
 Daniel Chiriță – Romania
 Daniel Florea – Romania
 Ciprian Marica – Romania
 Răzvan Raț – Romania
 Marian Savu – Romania
 Flavius Stoican – Romania
 Aleksei Bakharev – Russia
 Andrei Fedkov – Russia
 Aleksandr Shmarko – Russia
 Igor Strelkov – Russia
 Assane N'Diaye – Senegal
 Igor Duljaj – Serbia
 Milan Jovanović – Serbia
 Nenad Lalatović – Serbia
 Predrag Ocokoljić – Serbia
 Zvonimir Vukić – Serbia
 Muamer Vugdalič – Slovenia
 Tolga Seyhan – Turkey
 Damián Rodríguez – Uruguay
 Ruslan Uzakov – Uzbekistan
---
 Pedro Benítez – Paraguay

FC Stal Alchevsk 24
 Rubén Gómez – Argentina
 Hovhannes Demirchyan – Armenia
 Ara Hakobyan – Armenia
 Yegishe Melikyan – Armenia
 Sergej Tica – Bosnia and Herzegovina
 Alan – Brazil
 Paulo Vogt – Brazil
 Gil Bala – Brazil
 Stanimir Stalev – Bulgaria
 Paul Essola  – Cameroon
 Burnel Okana-Stazi  – Congo
 Shaib Touré – Cote d'Ivoire
 Serigne Diop – France
 Georgi Tsimakuridze – Georgia
 Marius Skinderis – Lithuania
 Vladimir Tanurcov – Moldova
 Sendley Sidney Bito  – Netherlands Antilles
 Samuel Okunowo – Nigeria
 Daniel Chiriță – Romania
 Bogdan Mara – Romania
 Florinel Mirea – Romania
 Florin Pârvu – Romania
 Sergei Bozhko – Russia
 Marko Grubelić – Serbia

SC Tavriya Simferopol 72+5
 Uliks Kotrri – Albania
 Çahangir Həsənzadə – Azerbaijan
 Mahmud Qurbanov – Azerbaijan
 Vadim Vasilyev – Azerbaijan
 İlham Yadullayev – Azerbaijan
 Vasil Khamutowski – Belarus
 Mihail Konopelko – Belarus
 Syarhey Kukalevich – Belarus
 Syarhey Kuznyatsow – Belarus
 Yawhen Linyow – Belarus
 Henadz Mardas – Belarus
 Hadson Nery – Brazil
 Edmar – Brazil
 Roger – Brazil
 Junior Godoi – Brazil
 Leandro Mesias – Brazil
 Everton – Brazil
 Saša Đuričić – Croatia
 Ivan Graf – Croatia
 Marin Ljubičić – Croatia
 Matija Špičić – Croatia
 Aleksandr Amisulashvili – Georgia
 Vladimir Burduli – Georgia
 Grigol Chanturia – Georgia
 Kakhaber Chkhetiani – Georgia
 Zviadi Chkhetiani – Georgia
 Shota Chomakhidze – Georgia
 Vasil Gigiadze – Georgia
 Grigol Imedadze – Georgia
 Zurab Ionanidze – Georgia
 Mamuka Jugeli – Georgia
 Gocha Trapaidze – Georgia
 Vidas Alunderis – Lithuania
 Andrius Jokšas – Lithuania
 Nerijus Vasiliauskas – Lithuania
 Audrius Veikutis – Lithuania
 Vidmantas Vyšniauskas – Lithuania
 Irmantas Zelmikas – Lithuania
 Besart Ibraimi – Macedonia
 Vladimir Cosse – Moldova
 Sendley Sidney Bito – Netherlands Antilles
 Ayodeji Brown – Nigeria
 Lucky Idahor – Nigeria
 Harrison Omoko – Nigeria
 Uchechukwu Uwakwe – Nigeria
 Pawel Hajduczek – Poland
 Iulian Dăniță – Romania
 Lucian Dobre – Romania
 Ionel Pârvu – Romania
 Yuri Getikov – Russia
 Valeri Gitya-Petrinskiy – Russia
 Sergei Gladyshev – Russia
 Dmitri Gulenkov – Russia
 Sergei Kosilov – Russia
 German Kutarba – Russia
 Marat Mulashev – Russia
 Vladislav Novikov – Russia
 Sergei Polstyanov – Russia
 Anatoli Skvortsov – Russia
 Dmitri Smirnov – Russia
 Vyaczeslav Vishnevskiy – Russia
 Aleksandr Zarutskiy – Russia
 Saša Cilinšek – Serbia
 Damir Kahriman – Serbia
 Željko Ljubenović – Serbia
 Slobodan Marković – Serbia
 Vladimir Mićović – Serbia
 Marko Milovanović – Serbia
 Saša Todić – Serbia
 Vitaliy Levchenko – Tajikistan
 Sergey Andreev – Uzbekistan
 Sadriddin Ishmirzaev – Uzbekistan
---
 Marius Rapalis – Lithuania
 Piotr Klepczarek – Poland
 Vladimir Vujović – Serbia
 Marin Miok – Serbia
 Milan Perić – Serbia

FC Temp Shepetivka 18
 Heorhiy Kandratsyew – Belarus
 Kakhaber Aladashvili – Georgia
 Giorgi Babuadze – Georgia
 Niazi Brunjadze – Georgia
 David Chaladze – Georgia
 Giorgi Chikhradze – Georgia
 Iuri Gabiskiria – Georgia
 Paata Gamtsemlidze – Georgia
 Gia Gvazava – Georgia
 Mamuka Jugeli – Georgia
 Avtandil Kapanadze – Georgia
 Tariel Kapanadze – Georgia
 Tamaz Pertia – Georgia
 Alexander Rekhviashvili – Georgia
 Mamuka Rusia – Georgia
 Merab Tevzadze – Georgia
 Gocha Zhorzholiani – Georgia
 Arsen Avakov – Tajikistan

FC Torpedo Zaporizhzhia 4+1
 Valeri Tkachuk – Russia
 Vladimir Zinich – Russia
 Arsen Avakov – Tajikistan
 Ruslan Uzakov – Uzbekistan
---
 Tigran Yesayan – Armenia

FC Veres Rivne 9
 Ihar Hurynovich – Belarus
 Pavel Radnyonak – Belarus
 Teymuraz Gadelia – Georgia
 Vakhtang Khvadagiani – Georgia
 Gintaras Kvitkauskas – Lithuania
 Aleksei Ilyin – Russia
 Oleg Mekhov – Russia
 Oleg Petrov – Russia
 Aleksei Snigiryov – Russia

FC Volyn Lutsk 35+2
 Tərlan Əhmədov – Azerbaijan
 Samir Əliyev – Azerbaijan
 Çahangir Həsənzadə – Azerbaijan
 Fərrux İsmayılov – Azerbaijan
 Kamal Quliyev – Azerbaijan
 İlham Yadullayev – Azerbaijan
 Vital Lanko – Belarus
 Branislav Krunić – Bosnia and Herzegovina
 Zdravko Šaraba – Bosnia and Herzegovina
 Ngassam Nana Falemi – Cameroon
 Moses Esingila Molongo – Cameroon
 Ernest Siankam – Cameroon
 Milan Božić – Canada
 Taavi Rähn – Estonia
 Boris Cebotari – Moldova
 Alexei Savinov – Moldova
 Miodrag Džudović – Montenegro
 Aleksandar Nedović – Montenegro
 Eddy Lord Dombraye – Nigeria
 Harrison Omoko – Nigeria
 Seweryn Gancarczyk – Poland
 Marcin Nowak – Poland
 Iulian Arhire – Romania
 Cornel Buta – Romania
 Constantin Schumacher – Romania
 Eduard Mor – Russia
 Yuri Petrov – Russia
 Papa Gueye – Senegal
 Marko Dević – Serbia
 Slavoljub Đorđević – Serbia
 Uroš Milosavljević – Serbia
 Saša Mitić – Serbia
 Dušan Popović – Serbia
 Aleksandar Trišović – Serbia
 Ján Zolna – Slovakia
---
 Radosław Cierzniak – Poland
 Vladimir Kuzhelev – Russia

FC Vorskla Poltava 50+3
 Debatik Curri – Albania
 Armend Dallku – Albania
 Ahmed Yanuzi – Albania
 Carlos Frontini – Argentina
 Yawhen Branavitski – Belarus
 Mihail Makowski – Belarus
 Uladzimir Makowski – Belarus
 Fabio Pereira – Brazil
 Velin Kefalov – Bulgaria
 Yordan Petkov – Bulgaria
 Patrick Ibanda – Cameroon
 Moses Esingila Molongo – Cameroon
 Valter Androšić – Croatia
 Saša Đuričić – Croatia
 Denis Glavina – Croatia
 Peter Mercado – Ecuador
 Anzor Kovteladze – Georgia
 Sergey Kostyuk – Kazakhstan
 Ismet Munishi – Kosovo
 Aleksandr Agarin – Kyrgyzstan
 Vitaliy Kobzar – Kyrgyzstan
 Andrius Jokšas – Lithuania
 Filip Despotovski – Macedonia
 Serghei Epureanu – Moldova
 Vladislav Lungu – Moldova
 Alexandru Onica – Moldova
 Lucky Idahor – Nigeria
 Daniel Njoku – Nigeria
 Chukwudi Nworgu – Nigeria
 Emmanuel Okoduwa – Nigeria
 Harrison Omoko – Nigeria
 Catalin Lichioiu Romania
 Vitali Grishin – Russia
 Aleksei Savelyev – Russia
 Yuri Sobol – Russia
 Igor Đinović – Serbia
 Miroslav Grumić – Serbia
 Jovan Markoski – Serbia
 Vladimir Milenković – Serbia
 Igor Petković – Serbia
 Vladimir Sandulović – Serbia
 Aleksandar Stoimirović – Serbia
 Tomáš Bruško – Slovakia
 Rusmin Dedič – Slovenia
 Zoran Pavlovič – Slovenia
 Sofiane Melliti – Tunisia
 Nazar Baýramow – Turkmenistan
 Rasim Kerimov – Turkmenistan
 Andriy Khomyn – Turkmenistan
 Guwançmuhammet Öwekow – Turkmenistan
---
 Robert Grizha – Albania
 Anzor Kovteladze – Georgia
 Alban Dragusha – Kosovo

FC Zakarpattia Uzhhorod 27
 Ervis Kraja – Albania
 Rubén Gómez – Argentina
 Mihail Makowski – Belarus
 Uladzimir Makowski – Belarus
 Igor Joksimović – Bosnia and Herzegovina
 Leandro Mesias – Brazil
 Kakhaber Aladashvili – Georgia
 Vladimir Burduli – Georgia
 Grigol Chanturia – Georgia
 Otar Martsvaladze – Georgia
 Zsolt Nagy – Hungary
 Aurimas Kučys – Lithuania
 Serghei Alexeev – Moldova
 Igor Andronic – Moldova
 Vadim Bolohan – Moldova
 Marcel Reşitca – Moldova
 Alexei Savinov – Moldova
 Mirko Raičević – Montenegro
 Sendley Sidney Bito  – Netherlands Antilles
 Eddy Lord Dombraye – Nigeria
 Charles Newuche – Nigeria
 Aleksandr Malygin – Russia
 Sergei Ryzhikh – Russia
 Minja Popović – Serbia
 Aleksandar Trišović – Serbia
 Aleksandr Khvostunov – Uzbekistan

FC Zirka Kirovohrad 7
 Vladislav Nosenko – Azerbaijan
 Dzyanis Kowba – Belarus
 Jevgeni Novikov – Estonia
 Vitaliy Abramov – Kazakhstan
 Vladimir Cosse – Moldova
 Vadim Firsov – Russia
 Roman Yevmenyev – Russia

FC Zorya Luhansk 63
 Parid Xhihani – Albania
 Rubén Gómez – Argentina
 Yegishe Melikyan – Armenia
 Samir Khairov – Azerbaijan
 Sergei Chernyshov – Belarus
 Aleksandr Gridyushko – Belarus
 Sergei Miroshkin – Belarus
 Aleksandr Mozgovoy – Belarus
 Yuriy Zenin – Belarus
 Flávio Dias – Brazil
 Junior Godoi – Brazil
 Adriano Spadoto – Brazil
 Jules Baga – Cameroon
 Patrick Ibanda – Cameroon
 Colince Ngaha Poungoue – Cameroon
 Guelor Rudy Bebhey-Ndey – Congo
 Patrick Iwosso – Congo
 Franck Madou – Côte d'Ivoire
 Jurica Puljiz – Croatia
 Stanislav Kitto – Estonia
 Aleksandr Marašov – Estonia
 Vladimir Burduli – Georgia
 Giorgi Chelidze – Georgia
 Temur Dimitrishvili – Georgia
 Mamuka Jugeli – Georgia
 Gela Kvitatiani – Georgia
 Jaba Lipartia – Georgia
 Mikhail Potskhveria – Georgia
 Georgi Tsimakuridze – Georgia
 Daniel Ashley Addo – Ghana
 Oleg Chukhleba – Kazakhstan
 Sergey Patsay – Kazakhstan
 Sergey Zhunenko – Kazakhstan
 Shpëtim Babaj – Kosovo
 Igoris Pankratjevas – Lithuania
 Adrian Bogdan – Moldova
 Vadim Bolohan – Moldova
 Vadim Kirilov – Moldova
 Iurie Miterev – Moldova
 Alexandru Popovici – Moldova
 Mirko Raičević – Montenegro
 Onyekachi Paul Nwoha – Nigeria
 Harrison Omoko – Nigeria
 Vadim Aleksandrov – Russia
 Maksim Aristarkhov – Russia
 Vadim Bozhenko – Russia
 Sergei Bozhko – Russia
 Sergei Kormiltsev – Russia
 Aleksandr Malygin – Russia
 Andrei Pletnyov – Russia
 Roman Yemelyanov – Russia
 Mirko Bunjevčević – Serbia
 Darko Dunjić – Serbia
 Mihajlo Cakić – Serbia
 Igor Petković – Serbia
 Miroslav Rikanović – Serbia
 Vladimir Zelenbaba – Serbia
 Lukáš Tešák – Slovakia
 Almir Sulejmanovič – Slovenia
 Aymen Bouchhioua – Tunisia
 Toafik Salhi – Tunisia
 Guwançmuhammet Öwekow – Turkmenistan
 Gennadiy Sharipov – Uzbekistan

See also 
List of foreign football players in Vyscha Liha

References

External sources 
  Career stats by FFU
  List of players in Premier-Liha
  Career history at National Football Teams

Association football in Ukraine lists
Ukrainian Premier League